Sick is the fourth album by French metal band Massacra. It introduces a notable change in the musical direction, including mid-paced thrash and groove elements. It was released in 1994.

Track listing
  "Twisted Mind"   – 6:44  
  "Madness Remains"  – 5:43  
  "Ordinary People"  – 5:16  
  "Closed Minded"  – 5:00  
  "Harmless Numbers"  – 5:00  
  "Lack of Talk"  – 5:02  
  "Broken Youth"  – 4:43  
  "Can’t Stand"  – 5:03  
  "My Reality"  – 5:13  
  "Suckers"  – 4:32
  "Piece of Real"  – 2:41

Personnel
Jean-Marc Tristani - Lead guitar
Fred Duval - Rhythm guitar
Pascal Jorgensen - Vocals, Bass
Matthias Limmer - Drums

1994 albums
Massacra albums